KSLL (1080 AM,) is a radio station broadcasting a country music format. Licensed to Price, Utah, United States, the station serves the Central Utah area. The station is currently owned by Ajb Holdings, LLC.

KSLL's skywave signal has been reported in Salt Lake City, Utah and Green River, Wyoming

1080 AM is a United States clear-channel frequency, on which KOAN in Anchorage, Alaska, KRLD in Dallas, Texas, and WTIC in Hartford, Connecticut share Class A status.  KSLL must leave the air between sunset and sunrise to protect the nighttime skywave signals of the Class A stations.

FM translator
The KSLL (1080 kHz) True Country signal is relayed to an FM translator; this translator provides the listener with the choice of FM 24 hours per day with stereophonic high fidelity sound.

References

External links
FCC History Cards for KSLL

Country radio stations in the United States
SLL
Radio stations established in 1980
1980 establishments in Utah
SLL